Home of Angels is a 1994 feature film written by James Oliva and Nicolas L. DePace and directed by Nick Stagliano.

Plot

Billy (Lance Robinson) defies his mother (Karin Wolfe) and father (Craig Sechler) and makes a secret trip from Long Island to Philadelphia to sneak his grandfather (Abe Vigoda) out of a nursing home and bring him home for the holidays. The convalescent home's inhabitants distract the staff so Billy and his confused Grandfather can make their escape. They cross path with a street gang whose leader (Aries Spears) commands a pursuit. They are given a hiding place by a concerned homeless man Buzzard Bracken (Sherman Hemsley), but their sanctuary is only temporary, as the gang invades the homeless camp and capture Billy and Gramps. Buzzard and his homeless friends rescue the two and raise money by panhandling in order to get them on their way back to Long Island and a Christmas reunion.

Cast

Production

Home of Angels was produced by Cloverlay Productions, whose only movie produced so far is Home of Angels.  Filmed on locations in Philadelphia, Pennsylvania in 1992,  was Aries Spears first film when he was then 17.

Distribution
Home of Angels was distributed on VHS by Bridgestone Multimedia.

Critical response

Tv Guide: "With its falsely upbeat approach to Alzheimer's disease and homelessness, the sticky-sweet 'Home of Angels' plays like a PSA masquerading as timely drama. Although it merits consideration for delving into topics rarely addressed in children's movies, its good intentions are undone by its cutesy tone"

References

External links

TCM listing

1994 films
American Christmas films
1990s English-language films
1994 directorial debut films